Pops in Seoul, airing from 1998 to 2021, has presented Korean pop music for the past eleven years on the network Arirang TV. The show's VJ presented current music, news about K-pop culture, and provided overseas viewers with the latest Korean pop music and information. Former host Daniel of DMTN was caught up in a drug scandal and as a result, stepped down March 13, 2013, being replaced by BtoB's Peniel. On August 18, 2013, Wonder Girls member Lim became the show's newest host. On March 10, 2014, Lim officially stepped down from her duties and was succeeded by five new hosts.

Each day of the week featured different segments, including new music videos, and a closer look at stars on Mondays with Skarf's leader Tasha, the latest K-pop news and a look back at past music on Tuesdays with Nak Hun, up-and-coming stars on Wednesdays with Electroboyz's 1kyne, an interview with top stars on Thursdays with Blady's Coco (in which they pick their own questions), and the top 20 songs of the week on Fridays with Sam Ku. On June 4, 2018, Samuel became host of the show. On July 1, 2019, Felix of Stray Kids took over as the new host. A.C.E's Kim Byeongkwan was the last MC from January 6, 2020 to March 31, 2021. 

The final episode of this series was aired on March 31, 2021 to conclude the program. The show is available on Viki, with subtitles in multiple languages.

Programmes
On 13 September 2012 boy band 100%, label mates of T.O.P Media Teen Top, was the first featured group new segment, ‘New Star.com'.
Soy - 2006
Isak - 2009
NS Yoon-G - 2011
Daniel (DMTN) 
Peniel (BtoB) - March 2013- August 2013
Woo Hye-lim (Wonder Girls) - August 2013 - March 2014
Nancy (Momoland) - March 2017 - June 2018
Samuel - June 2018 - July 2019
Felix (Stray Kids) - July 2019 - January 2020
Kim Byeongkwan (A.C.E) - January 2020 - 31st March 2021

See also
Music programs of South Korea
SBS Inkigayo
KBS Music Bank
MBC Show! Music Core
Mnet M Countdown
Arirang TV Simply K-Pop (formerly called The M-Wave and Wave K)
JTBC Music On Top
JTBC Music Universe K-909
MBC M Show Champion
SBS M The Show

References

External links

About The Program | Pops in Seoul

South Korean music television shows
K-pop television series
2021 South Korean television series endings